The Stafford Street drill hall is a former military installation in Wolverhampton, West Midlands.

History
The building was designed as the headquarters of the 3rd Volunteer Battalion, the South Staffordshire Regiment and was completed in 1890. This unit evolved to become the 6th Battalion, the South Staffordshire Regiment in 1908. The battalion was mobilised at the drill hall in August 1914 before being deployed to the Western Front. The drill hall was also the home of D Squadron, Staffordshire Yeomanry.
 
The battalion amalgamated with the 5th Battalion to form the 5th/6th (Territorial) Battalion, The Staffordshire Regiment (The Prince of Wales's) with its headquarters in Wolverhampton in 1967. After the battalion moved to Wolseley House in Wolverhampton, the Stafford Street drill hall was decommissioned and acquired by the University of Wolverhampton. It has since been converted by Liam Wordley, a developer, into student accommodation.

References

Drill halls in England
Buildings and structures in Wolverhampton